João Simões Lopes Neto International Airport  is the airport serving Pelotas, Brazil.

This airport was named after the regional writer João Simões Lopes Neto (1865 — 1916). 

It is operated by CCR.

History
On June 22, 1927 the city of Pelotas received the first official commercial passenger flight operated by the first Brazilian airline, Varig, founded only a month earlier. The flight Porto Alegre/Pelotas/Rio Grande, operated by an amphibian Dornier Wal, used Pelotas River for landing and take-off operations. However, as early as 1930 a small terminal was built by a grass strip on the site where today is the airport.

In 1935 the airport with all the necessary amenities was officially inaugurated and continues in operation ever since.

In 1997 the whole airport complex was extensively renovated and a new terminal was opened in 1998. In 2001 it was upgraded to international status.

Previously operated by Infraero, on April 7, 2021 CCR won a 30-year concession to operate the airport.

Pelotas is commonly used by the Brazilian Air Force as the last stop in Brazil on its flights to the Brazilian Antarctic Base.

Airlines and destinations

Accidents and incidents
11 January 1949: a SAVAG Lockheed Model 18-10-01 Lodestar registration PP-SAC flying from Pelotas to Porto Alegre crashed just after take-off from Pelotas killing all 8 occupants. Causes are likely to have been fuel contamination.
12 April 1960: a Varig Douglas C-53 registration PP-CDS operating a flight for Cruzeiro do Sul from Pelotas to Porto Alegre collided with two other aircraft, crashed and caught fire after it deviated to the right on take-off and an over correction caused a sharp turn to the left. Of the 22 passengers and crew aboard, 10 died.

Access

See also

List of airports in Brazil

References

External links

Airports in Rio Grande do Sul
Airports established in 1930